Kanga is an ethnic group of Sudan. They number about 10,000 persons. They live in Northern Sudan in the Nuba Mountains and are one of the people called "Nuba". The Kanga speak Kanga, a Nilo-Saharan language.

References
Joshua Project

Nuba peoples
Ethnic groups in Sudan